The Heze School, also called the Ho-tse School, was a short-lived school of Chinese Chan Buddhism during the Tang dynasty that was founded by Heze Shenhui (670–762) and who last patriarch was Guifeng Zongmi.  Zongmi's writings and interpretation of Chan would later have a strong influence on Korean Seon Buddhism particularly through Chinul even after the school had died out.

History 
During the Tang dynasty, Chan Buddhism was roughly divided into a "Northern School" led by Yuquan Shenxiu and a Southern School, with the Northern School being the ascendant school due its government patronage.  Heze Shenhui was a reputed disciple of Huineng and starting in 732, began a concerted attack on the Northern School teachings.  Eventually, this led to the exile of Shenhui until the An Lushan Rebellion, which devastated both Tang capitals.  Shenhui and others were recalled to help with rebuilding the eastern capital Luoyang, and Shenhui successfully raised money for the government, which in turn reversed the exile punishment and allowed Shenhui to set up a monastery at Luoyang.

The Northern School greatly diminished after this, but Shenhui's disciples were unable to maintain the status of the Southern School or effectively propagate its teachings until Zongmi.  Zongmi, the fifth patriarch, was the most articulate of Shenhui's disciples and went on to write many treatises that influenced Chan Buddhism throughout East Asia.

However, after Zongmi, the school declined further and virtually disappeared after the Anti-Buddhist Persecution of 845.

References 

Buddhism in China